Halu Sara or Holu Sara may refer to:
 Bala Holu Sara
 Pain Halu Sara